IEEE Transactions on Antennas and Propagation is a peer-reviewed scientific journal published by the IEEE Antennas & Propagation Society. It covers research on and applications of all aspects of antenna technology and the propagation of electromagnetic waves. It was established in 1952 and is published monthly along with occasional special issues.

Abstracting and indexing 
The journal is abstracted and indexed in the Science Citation Index and Current Contents/Engineering, Computing & Technology. According to the Journal Citation Reports, the journal has a 2020 impact factor of 4.388.

See also
 IEEE Antennas and Wireless Propagation Letters

References

External links
 

Transactions On Antennas and Propagation
Physics journals
Monthly journals
Publications established in 1952
English-language journals